N.F.C. Nagar Colony is a village in Ranga Reddy district in Telangana, India. It falls under Ghatkesar mandal.

References

Villages in Ranga Reddy district